Reserves are funds collected for the long-term maintenance or replacements of the common areas in a common-interest development (CID).  The funds accumulate until they are needed for such.

In a common-interest development, the funds are managed through a board of directors (BOD) elected by the homeowners' association (HOA) from the existing owners.  The board performs its duties based upon the Covenants, Conditions, and Restrictions (CC&Rs). As outlined in the CC&Rs the board is responsible for producing budgets for the maintenance fees to be assessed to the owners.

A reserve study is a coordinated effort between HOA management, BOD, contractors/vendors, interior designers, architects, engineers, accountants, investment counselors and sometimes lenders for producing an overall reserve plan.  The process begins with the identification of the individual common area items (or reserve items) which need to be reserved for in the reserve study analysis.

There is a standardized four-part test for determining if an asset is appropriate for reserve designation:
 The asset must be a common area maintenance responsibility
 The asset must have a useful life
 The asset must have a predictable remaining useful life
 The asset must be above a minimum threshold cost

Once the reserve items have been identified and established as the reserve component list, the following information will then be determined for each item by the professionals outlined above:

 Project description (E.g. fence - paint or fence - replace)
 Description/Quantity
 Useful life
 Remaining useful life
 Current replacement cost

Additional useful information such as:
 Cost Basis (current cost by square yards, linear feet, each, etc.)
 Freight and labor (costs to receive and install)
 Salvage (estimated value of the item when replaced, if any)
 Date placed in service or the date last maintained or replaced

From this a reserve financial plan and budget is created to determine the amount to be assessed to the owners in their maintenance fees.

References

Housing in the United States